Lefteris Astras (born 14 February 1997) is a Greek professional footballer who plays as a goalkeeper for Super League 2 club Proodeftiki.

References

External links 

1997 births
Living people
Footballers from Athens
Greek footballers
Association football goalkeepers
Super League Greece players
Super League Greece 2 players
Panionios F.C. players
Apollon Smyrnis F.C. players
Apollon Larissa F.C. players
Segunda División B players
San Fernando CD players
Greek expatriate footballers
Greek expatriate sportspeople in Spain
Expatriate footballers in Spain
Greece under-21 international footballers
Greece youth international footballers